Mauria killipii is a species of plant in the family Anacardiaceae. It is endemic to Peru.

References

Trees of Peru
killipii
Vulnerable plants
Taxonomy articles created by Polbot